Francisco Robles Ortega (born 2 March 1949) is a Mexican prelate of the Catholic Church, a cardinal since 2007. He is the Archbishop of Guadalajara. Cardinal Robles had previously served as archbishop of Monterrey from 2003 to 2011. He is also, as of November 2012, the incoming president-elect of the Roman Catholic Mexican Episcopal (Bishops') Conference, to replace the outgoing president, Archbishop Carlos Aguiar Retes, the Metropolitan Archbishop of the Roman Catholic Archdiocese of Tlalnepantla.

Biography

Early life and ordination
Francisco Robles Ortega was born in Mascota, as the third of the sixteen children of Francisco Robles Arreola (b. 1917) and Teresa Ortega de Robles (b. 1927). He studied humanities at the minor seminary in Autlán, philosophy at the seminary in Guadalajara, and theology at the seminary in Zamora.

Robles was ordained to the priesthood by Bishop José Vásquez Silos on 20 July 1976, and then studied at the Pontifical Gregorian University in Rome until 1979, obtaining his licentiate in theology. Upon his return to Mexico, he served as vicar general of Autlán and taught philosophy and theology at its seminary. He was made diocesan administrator of Autlán following the death of Bishop Vásquez Silos in July 1990

Bishop
On 30 April 1991, Robles was appointed Auxiliary Bishop of Toluca and Titular Bishop of Bossa by Pope John Paul II. He received his episcopal consecration on the following 5 June from Bishop Alfredo Torres Romero, with Bishops José Hernández González and Javier Lozano Barragán serving as co-consecrators, in the Cathedral of Toluca.

Robles was later named diocesan administrator of Toluca following the death of Bishop Torres Romero on 15 October 1995. He finally became Bishop of Toluca on 15 June 1996, and was installed on 15 July of that same year. On 25 January 2003, he was advanced to Archbishop of Monterrey.

Cardinal

Pope Benedict XVI created him cardinal-priest of Santa Maria della Presentazione in the consistory of 24 November 2007, he took possession of the titular church on 25 October 2008 . Cardinal Robles Ortega will be eligible to participate in any future papal conclaves until he reaches the age of eighty on 2 March 2029 unless he dies before.

On 5 January 2011 he was appointed among the first members of the newly created Pontifical Council for the Promotion of the New Evangelisation.

On 7 December 2011 Cardinal Robles was appointed the Archbishop of Guadalajara to replace the retiring Juan Sandoval Íñiguez who had reached the age limit. As a result, the see of Monterrey fell vacant. On 24 November 2012 he was appointed a member of the Pontifical Council for Social Communications.

He was appointed as a member of the Congregation for Bishops on 16 December 2013 for a five-year renewable term.

He was one of the cardinal electors who participated in the 2013 papal conclave that selected Pope Francis.

Views

Drug politics
The archbishop of Monterrey has called on the country's political parties and organizations to take action to avoid infiltration in their ranks by drug traders.

Secularism in education
Cardinal Robles said "we are against the change proposed by the decree to reform Article 3" of the Constitution because it seeks to encourage secularism in private educational institutions, eliminating the subject of religion, which trains young people in moral values.

Poverty and humility
In naming archbishop Francisco Robles of Monterrey as one of 23 new Roman Catholic cardinals, analysts say the Vatican chose a clergyman who advocates for the poor and beseeches the faithful to embrace humility.

Family policy
Cardinal Robles has said that the family is "an institution that is natural, that is the basis of society", and he warned those who oppose a new law that would protect it not to attempt to "supplant such an important institution as the family."

References

External links and additional sources

 
Cardinals of the Holy Roman Church
 (for Chronology of Bishops)
 (for Chronology of Bishops)

1949 births
Living people
People from Jalisco
Mexican cardinals
20th-century Roman Catholic bishops in Mexico
21st-century Roman Catholic archbishops in Mexico
Pontifical Gregorian University alumni
Cardinals created by Pope Benedict XVI
Members of the Pontifical Council for the Promotion of the New Evangelisation
Members of the Pontifical Council for Social Communications
Members of the Congregation for Bishops
Roman Catholic archbishops of Guadalajara